SuperMUC was a supercomputer of the Leibniz Supercomputing Centre (LRZ) of the Bavarian Academy of Sciences. It was housed in the LRZ's data centre in Garching near Munich. It was decommissioned in January 2020, having been superseded by the more powerful SuperMUC-NG.

History 

SuperMUC (the suffix 'MUC' alludes to the IATA code of Munich's airport) is operated by the Leibniz Supercomputing Centre, a European centre for supercomputing. In order to house its hardware, the infrastructure space of the Leibniz Supercomputing Centre was more than doubled in 2012. SuperMUC was the fastest European supercomputer when it entered operation in the summer of 2012 and is currently ranked No. 20 in the Top500 list of the world's fastest supercomputers.
SuperMUC serves European researchers of many fields, including medicine, astrophysics, quantum chromodynamics, computational fluid dynamics, computational chemistry, life sciences, genome analysis and earth quake simulations.

Performance 
SuperMUC is an IBM iDataPlex system containing 19,252 Intel Xeon Sandy Bridge-EP and Westmere-EX multi-core processors (155,656 cores), for a peak performance of about 3PFLOPS (3×1015FLOPS). It has 340TB of main memory and 15PB of hard disk space. It uses a new form of cooling that IBM developed, called Aquasar, that uses hot water to cool the processors. IBM claims that this design saves 40percent of the energy normally needed to cool a comparable system.

SuperMUC is connected to powerful visualization systems, which consist of a large 4K stereoscopic powerwall as well as a five-sided CAVE artificial virtual reality environment.

References

External links 

 "System description of SuperMUC at the LRZ website"
 Rechnen und Heizen: Neuer Supercomputer für Garching  bei br-online.de, 13. Dezember 2010
 "PRACE Announces 'SuperMUC' System for LRZ"

IBM supercomputers
Petascale computers
Supercomputing in Europe
IDataPlex supercomputers